Le Courrier de la Nouvelle-Écosse is an Acadian newspaper published in southwest Nova Scotia, Canada.

History 
The newspaper was created by Désiré d'Eon in 1937 in response to the lack of opportunities to read in the French language in southwestern Nova Scotia.

Nova Scotia Archives and Records Management have recently digitized 3,419 issues of the newspaper, comprising 68,352 pages, covering 1937 to 2002. This is considered an important historical resource for Nova Scotia's francophone community.

Content 
The paper covers the community interest in the Acadian area.

A TV listing page, called Tele Guide, provides the listings for television schedule for the Canadian television networks, including the ones broadcasting from Detroit, Michigan.

References 

Weekly newspapers published in Nova Scotia
Newspapers established in 1937
1937 establishments in Nova Scotia
French-language newspapers published in Canada